The women's 57 kg Judo competitions at the 2014 Commonwealth Games in Glasgow, Scotland was held on 24 July at the Scottish Exhibition and Conference Centre. Judo returned to the program, after last being competed back in 2002.

Preliminaries

Repechages

References

W57
2014
Commonwealth 57